The Cortes of León or Decreta of León from year 1188 was a parliamentary body in the medieval Kingdom of León. According to UNESCO it is the first documented example of parliamentarism in history.

This was a gathering of the nobility and the higher clergy called to advise the king, used in numerous countries during the Middle Ages. Because of the seriousness of the situation, Alfonso IX also called in representatives of the wealthy merchants and tradesmen from the most important cities of the kingdom, thus uniting the three Estates of the Realm in one council.

However, all these meetings were exceptional and did not lead to a regular attendance of commoners (the Third Estate) in the council.

León's Cortes dealt with matters like the right to private property, the inviolability of domicile, the right to appeal to justice opposite the King and the obligation of the King to consult the Cortes before entering a war.

See also
  - the name of various parliamentary bodies in Spain and Portugal from the Middle Ages to today

References

Sources
 Encyclopædia Britannica, 1911: "History of Europe" (Birth of parliamentary bodies)
 O'Callaghan, Joseph F. "The beginnings of the Cortes of León-Castile», American History Review 1969, p. 1504.
 O'Callaghan, Joseph F. "A History of Medieval Spain". Ithaca 1975.
 Procter, Evelyn. "Curia and Cortes in León and Castile 1072-1295". Cambridge 1980.
 Procter, Evelyn."The Interpretation of Clause 3 in the Decrees of León," EHR 85 (1970
 Merriman, Roger B. "The Cortes of the Spanish Kingdoms in the Later Middle Ages," AHR 16 (1911)
 Keane, John. "The Life and Death of Democracy". Simon & Schuster, London, 2009.
  The Decreta of León of 1188. Spanish version.

Medieval organizations
12th-century establishments in the Kingdom of León
1180s establishments in Europe
1188 establishments in Europe
Memory of the World Register in Spain
Defunct national legislatures